Berryteuthis anonychus, also known as the minimal armhook squid or smallfin gonate squid, is a species of squid in the family Gonatidae. It is distinguished from other gonatids by the lack of hooks on all members, except for females on the base of arms I to III.

References

External links
Tree of Life web project: Berryteuthis anonychus

Squid
Molluscs described in 1963